The Slab-Grave culture is an archaeological culture of the Late Bronze Age and Early Iron Age Mongols. The ethnogenesis of modern Mongolian people is linked to the Slab-Grave culture by historical and archaeological evidence, and genetic research also links modern Mongolians to the Slab Grave culture.

According to various sources, it is dated from 1,300 to 300 BC. The Slab-Grave culture became an eastern wing of a huge nomadic Eurasian world, which saw the emergence and hybridization of various cultures, such as Scythians and the Xiongnu. The anthropological type of the population is predominantly Mongoloid, while the western newcomers from the area of Tuva and north-western Mongolia were Caucasoids.

The origin of this Slab-Grave culture is not definitively known. The ornamentation and shape of various bronze objects and especially the technology and stylistic methods used in the making of artistic bronzes found in the slab graves have led scholars to attribute at least some of them to the Karasuk period. At the same time it appears that the slab-grave culture shares some features with the Karasuk culture of southern Siberia (link: 1).

Area

Slab-grave cultural monuments are found in northern, central and eastern Mongolia, Inner Mongolia, Northwest China (Xinjiang region, Qilian Mountains etc.), Manchuria, Lesser Khingan, Buryatia, southern Irkutsk Oblast and southern and central Zabaykalsky Krai. The name of the culture is derived from the main typology of the graves, its graves have rectangular fences (chereksurs) of vertically set slabs of gneiss or granite, with stone kurgans inside the fence. Were found settlements, burial and ritual structures, rock paintings, deer stones, and other remains of that culture. 
 
The most recent graves date from the 6th century BC, and the earliest monuments of the next in time Xiongnu culture belong to the 2nd century BC. The gap is not less than three centuries, and the monuments that would fill this chronological gap are almost unknown.

Burials

The slab graves are both individual and collective in groups of 5–8 to large burials with up to 350 fences. Large cemeteries have a clear plan. In Aga Buryat District were found more than three thousand fences. Most of the graves are burials, some are ritual fences – cenotaphs. Graves are oriented along west-east axis. Deceased are laid on the back, with the head to the east.
  
The fences vary from 1.5 m to 9.6 m, a height of the slabs vary from 0,5 m to 3 m. The grave pits under some kurgan mounds are covered with slabs that often are of considerable sizes. The depth of the burial pits vary from 0,6 m to 2,5–3 meters, in deep graves the side slabs were stacked and covered with several slab layers. In places within the fence sometimes were installed deer stones, single slabs with images of deer, less frequently of the horses, accompanied with solar signs and armaments.

A burial complex on the Lami mountain in the Nerchinsk area consisted of graves about 30 meters in length, divided into 4 sections. Not plundered fence was covered by several slabs each weighing up to 0,5 tons. Under cover slabs was an altar with skulls of horses, cows and sheep. Below were five burial chambers for inhumation.

Most of the graves were looted. The buried clothing and footwear is colorful, with various ornaments of bronze, bone and stone: plaques, buttons, necklaces, pendants, mirrors, cowrie shells. The accompanying tools are rare: Needles and needle beds, knives and axes-celts. Even less common are weapons: arrowheads, daggers, bow end caps. In some graves are horse harnesses, whip handles. There are bronze objects, fewer iron and precious metals.

Jars are round-bottom earthenware, some tripods. Vessel ornament are impressions, rolled bands, indentations. The art of the slab-grave culture belongs to the "animal style" art that depicts domesticated and wild animals, daily life and main occupations. The slab-grave culture art has many common features with cultures of Southern Siberia: Karasuk, Tagar, and others.

Graves in East Baikal 
Thousands of graves can now be seen in the southern Baikal area. In some cases they form a cemetery, with a clear plan and a strict order. For example, at lake Balzino about a hundred graves formed circles and rectangles. They are usually located at higher elevation, exposed to sun. Monumental burials mark greatness of the people who once lived there. They became an integral part of the East Baikal steppes cultural and historical landscape.

Ethnic relations 
According to anthropologists, they are classified as the southern Siberian branch of the greater Mongolian morphology. The genesis of the anthropological type is under discussion. Presumably, its origin comes from the anthropological type of the known Neolithic population of the southern Baikal and eastern Mongolia.

See also
Animal Style
Deer stone
History of Mongolia
History of Asia
Lower Xiajiadian culture
Ordos culture
Xiongnu
Xianbei

Literature 
 Borovka G.I., "Archaeological surveys of the river Tola", in the book: Northern Mongolia, Vol. 2, Leningrad, 1927;
 Dikov N.N., "Bronze Age in E.Baikal", Ulan-Ude, 1958
 Grishin S. "Bronze and early Iron Age of the E.Baikal, Moscow, 1975
 Konstantinov A.V., Konstantinova N.N. "History of E. Baikal (from ancient times to 1917)", Chita-2002.
 Kirillov O.I., Stavpetskaya M.N., "Religious and ritual structures of E.Baikal pastoralists in 1st millennia BC", //Young Archaeology and Ethnology oid Siberia, Chita, 1999, Vol. 1.
 Kiselev S.V., "Mongolia in ancient times", "Bulletin of USSR Akademy", Series History and Philosophy, 1947, Vol. 4
 Okladnikov A.P., Kirillov I.I., "South-East E.Baikal in the Stone Age and Early Bronze Age", Novosibirsk, 1980
 Tsibiktarov A.D. "Slab Grave Culture graves of Mongolia and E.Baikal", Ulan-Ude, 1998
 D. Tumen. Anthropology of Archaeological Populations from Northeast Asia :user.dankook.ac.kr/~oriental/Journal/pdf_new/49/11.pdf''

References
 

Archaeological cultures of Central Asia
Archaeological cultures of Northern Asia
Bronze Age cultures of Asia
Iron Age cultures of Asia
Archaeological cultures of China
Archaeological cultures in Mongolia
Archaeological cultures in Russia
Archaeology of Inner Mongolia
History of Mongolia